Everybody's Sweetheart may refer to:

Everybody's Sweetheart (1919 film), American comedy starring Elsie Janis; released as A Regular Girl
Everybody's Sweetheart (1920 film), American drama starring Olive Thomas
Everybody's Sweetheart (album), by LeAnn Rimes
Everybody's Sweetheart (comic strip), by Edgar Martin; also known as Girls, Boots and Her Buddies, and Boots
"Everybody's Sweetheart" (song), by Vince Gill